Justin Shugg (born December 24, 1991) is a Canadian professional ice hockey forward. Shugg was selected by the Carolina Hurricanes in the fourth round (105th overall) of the 2010 NHL Entry Draft. Retired May 2021

Playing career 
Shugg played four seasons (2007-2011) of major junior hockey in the Ontario Hockey League (OHL) where he scored 101 goals and 115 assists for 216 points and registered 146 penalty minutes in 262 games played.

On June 17, 2011, the Carolina Hurricanes of the National Hockey League (NHL) signed Shugg to a three-year entry-level contract and sent him to the Charlotte Checkers of the American Hockey League (AHL). In 2014–15, he saw the ice in three NHL contests for the Hurricanes.

At the conclusion of the 2015–16 season and not offered a new contract with the Hurricanes, Shugg as a free agent left North America and accepted an initial try-out contract with Latvian club, Dinamo Riga of the KHL on July 27, 2016. After 33 KHL contests, including two goals and nine assists, he parted company with Dinamo on December 13, 2016. Some days later, he inked a deal with Augsburger Panther of the Deutsche Eishockey Liga (DEL) in Germany for the remainder of the 2016–17 season.

After playing out the season with Augsburger, Shugg opted to remain in Germany, signing a one-year deal with Kölner Haie on June 8, 2017. In the following 2017–18 season, Shugg continued showing his offensive touch in the DEL, contributing with 16 goals and 37 points in 52 games with the Sharks.

He joined his third German club, in his third season, agreeing to a one-year contract with reigning three-time champions EHC München on June 19, 2018.

Career statistics

References

External links

1991 births
Living people
Augsburger Panther players
Canadian ice hockey left wingers
Carolina Hurricanes draft picks
Carolina Hurricanes players
Charlotte Checkers (2010–) players
Dinamo Riga players
Florida Everblades players
Frederikshavn White Hawks players
Ice hockey people from Ontario
Kölner Haie players
Mississauga St. Michael's Majors players
EHC München players
Oshawa Generals players
SaiPa players
Sportspeople from Niagara Falls, Ontario
Windsor Spitfires players